The Jackal-class gunvessel (alternatively spelled Jackall) was a class of two second-class iron paddle gunvessels built for the Royal Navy in the mid 1840s. They served in the Mediterranean and South Atlantic, and latterly on fishery protection duties off Scotland.

Design
Orders for both ships were placed on 16 January 1844. They were designed by the builder, Robert Napier and Sons and approved on 17 April 1844 by the Surveyor of the Navy, Sir William Symonds.

They were each fitted with a Napier two-cylinder side-lever steam engine driving side paddles. The engine was rated at 150 nominal horsepower and on trials developed . Two gaff-rigged masts were provided, making them schooners. The armament consisted of a single 18-pounder (22cwt) carronade on a pivot mounting and two 24-pounder (13cwt) carronades.

Construction
Both ships were built at Napier's Govan yard. Jackall was built as yard number 8, and Lizard as number 9.  Jackall was launched on 28 November 1844, and Lizard followed exactly a month later.

Service
Jackall served in the Mediterranean and at Ascension, and by 1864 she was employed on fishery protection duties off the west coast of Scotland.

Lizard also served in the Mediterranean, and took part in an Anglo-French action in Uruguay in 1845, receiving serious damage and losing 4 men. By 1858 she was also engaged in fishery protection duties off Scotland.

Ships

Notes

References

Ships built on the River Clyde
1844 ships
Victorian-era gunboats of the United Kingdom
Gunvessels of the Royal Navy
Gunboat classes